Kumai may refer to:

Kumai, subdistrict in Central Kalimantan, Indonesia
Kumai language, aka Wahgi, a Trans–New Guinea language spoken in the highlands of Papua New Guinea
Kumai River, river in Central Kalimantan
Kumai (village), village in the Indian state of Bihar
Kumai Bahun, better known as Kumaoni people
Kumai (surname)